MV Coastal Inspiration is the second of three  ships delivered to BC Ferries. Launched in 2007 and entering service in 2008, Coastal Inspiration operates on the Duke Point – Tsawwassen route in British Columbia. The vessel collided with the terminal at Duke Point on December 20, 2011, suffering significant damage that kept the ship in the dockyard until January 2012.

Description
Coastal Inspiration is the second of three double-ended  ferries. The ferry has capacity for 1,304 crew and passengers along with 310 vehicles that meet the AEU equivalent. Coastal Inspiration is equipped with a variety amenities including coffee shops and lounges.

Service history
On September 17, 2004, BC Ferries awarded a contract to Flensburger Schiffbau-Gesellschaft of Flensburg, Germany to build three double-ended ferries. The second keel was laid down on April 23, 2007, with the yard number 734. The ferry was launched on August 31, 2007, and named Coastal Inspiration in 2006. The ferry was completed on February 8, 2008. The vessel departed Flensburg on February 9, 2008, transited the Panama Canal on March 7 and arrived in Nanaimo, British Columbia at Departure Bay on March 25.

Coastal Inspiration began regular service on June 16, 2008, on the Duke Point – Tsawwassen route. It had made unscheduled training runs during the week leading up to the date. On August 15, 2008, a fire broke out in one of the vehicles on the main car deck aboard the ferry after departing Tsawwassen.

On December 20, 2011, Coastal Inspiration experienced a hard landing upon arrival at Duke Point terminal. The terminal berth sustained significant damage and the vessel's port side doors were also damaged. The terminal required extensive repairs and its closure rerouted all service through Departure Bay. Repairs to the ship were completed in January 2012, and the terminal reopened in May 2012. The cause of the crash was later determined to be crew error. On August 1, 2013, Coastal Inspiration and  rescued three boaters whose craft had overturned near Tsawwassen terminal.

Notes

Citations

External links
 

Coastal-class ferries
Ships built in Flensburg
2007 ships